Harpa crenata, common name the Panama harp, is a species of sea snail, a marine gastropod mollusk in the family Harpidae, the harp snails.

Description
The size of the shell varies between 50 mm and 100 mm.

Distribution
This marine species occurs in the Gulf of California, Western Mexico down to Peru

References

 DANCE, S.P. & G.T. POPPE, 1999 Family Harpidae. In : A Conchological Iconography (ConchBooks, ed.), 69 p.

External links
 

Harpidae
Gastropods described in 1822